Joseph Bailey Keeble (August 29, 1909 – April 27, 1984) was an American football back who played one season with the Cleveland Rams of the National Football League. He played college football at the University of California, Los Angeles. He first enrolled at Holtville High School in Holtville, California before transferring to Oneonta Military Academy in South Pasadena, California. Keeble was also a member of the Westwood Cubs, Chicago Cardinals and Pittsburgh Americans.

College career
Keeble joined the UCLA Bruins in 1930 and played football and basketball for them. He lettered for the Bruins from 1931 to 1933. He earned First-team All-PCC honors as a fullback in 1932.

Professional career
Keeble played for the Westwood Cubs from 1934 to 1936. He  signed with the Chicago Cardinals in 1935 but did not appear in a game for the team. He  played for the Pittsburgh Americans of the American Football League in 1936. Keeble played in seven games, starting two, for the Cleveland Rams during the 1937 season.

Coaching career
Keeble was later head coach at Madera High School in Madera, California.

References

External links
 Just Sports Stats

1909 births
1984 deaths
American football fullbacks
American football halfbacks
American men's basketball players
Cleveland Rams players
Pittsburgh Americans players
UCLA Bruins football players
UCLA Bruins men's basketball players
High school football coaches in California
People from Cleburne, Texas
Players of American football from Texas